Ojinaga Municipality (formally:  Manuel Ojinaga ) is one of the 67 municipalities of Chihuahua, in northern Mexico. The municipal seat lies at Ojinaga, a rural bordertown on the U.S.-Mexico border. The municipality has an area of 9,500.50 km2 (3,668.16 sq mi).

Geography

Ojinaga, named after Juarista governor Manuel Ojinaga, reported a 2010 census population of 22,744 people in the town, which serves as municipal seat of the municipality of 26,304 inhabitants. The municipality includes numerous very small outlying communities, the largest of which are El Oasis and Nueva Holanda.

Towns and villages
The municipality has 108 localities. The largest are:

Adjacent municipalities and counties
 Manuel Benavides Municipality – southeast
 Camargo Municipality – south
 Julimes Municipality – southwest
 Aldama Municipality – southwest
 Coyame del Sotol Municipality – west
 Guadalupe Municipality – northwest
 Presidio County, Texas – north and northeast

References

2010 census tables: INEGI: Instituto Nacional de Estadística, Geografía e Informática
Chihuahua Enciclopedia de los Municipios de México

External links
Ojinaga Hoy
La Perla del Desierto, local website
Camino Minerals, Maijoma mine, Ojinaga Municipality

Municipalities of Chihuahua (state)
Mexico–United States border crossings
Chihuahua (state) populated places on the Rio Grande